Vada Agaram is one of the neighbourhoods of the city of Chennai in Tamil Nadu, India. It is located in the northern part of the city and forms a part of Egmore-Nungambakkam taluk.

References 
 Chennai district website

Neighbourhoods in Chennai